Ashin-e Olya (also Romanized as Āshīn-e ‘Olyā; also known as Ashin, Āshīn Bālā, and Āshīn-e Bālā) is a village in Soghan Rural District, Soghan District, Arzuiyeh County, Kerman Province, Iran. At the 2006 census, its population was 158, in 38 families.

References 

Populated places in Arzuiyeh County